The Bayer designation Gamma Fornacis (γ For / γ Fornacis) is shared by two stars, in the constellation Fornax:
γ¹ Fornacis
γ² Fornacis

Fornacis, Gamma
Fornax (constellation)